Chimaeromyrma is an extinct, monotypic genus of ant, first described in 1988 by Dlussky. It contains the single species C. brachycephala.

References

Further reading
Chimaeromyrma - AntWiki

†
†
Fossil ant genera